James Kelly (born 29 December 1983) is a former professional Australian rules footballer who played for the Geelong Football Club and Essendon Football Club in the Australian Football League (AFL).

Playing career

Since 2001, Kelly has played with the Geelong Football Club. Playing as an on-baller in the powerful midfield, he has shown capability in gaining many possessions and running well, as well as showing great courage. Kelly, is a natural born leader who has played a pivotal role in Geelong's dominant era, one of only twelve players to play in all three of Geelong's recent premierships.

He was a member of Geelong's 2006 NAB Cup Premiership team, as well as the drought-breaking 2007 AFL Premiership Team. He was also a member of Geelong's losing side in the 2008 Grand Final and their victorious sides in the 2009 and 2011 Grand Finals. He was delisted at the end of the 2015 AFL season, despite averaging 20.5 disposals in 17 games, he subsequently retired from the AFL before signing with the Essendon Football Club in January 2016 as a top-up player in the wake of the club's supplements scandal. Under the player top-up rules, he was delisted at the conclusion of the 2016 season, however, in November he re-signed with Essendon during the delisted free agency period. On 16 August 2017, Kelly retired from playing AFL after 313 games with Geelong and Essendon.

Coaching career
Kelly joined the Essendon coaching staff for the 2018 season and remained there for three years, retiring in February, 2021.

Kelly re-joined Geelong as an assistant coach for the 2022 season

Statistics

|- style="background-color: #EAEAEA"
! scope="row" style="text-align:center" | 2002
|style="text-align:center;"|
| 9 || 15 || 7 || 5 || 137 || 85 || 222 || 41 || 49 || 0.5 || 0.3 || 9.1 || 5.7 || 14.8 || 2.7 || 3.3
|-
! scope="row" style="text-align:center" | 2003
|style="text-align:center;"|
| 9 || 18 || 6 || 8 || 129 || 109 || 238 || 43 || 55 || 0.3 || 0.4 || 7.2 || 6.1 || 13.2 || 2.4 || 3.1
|- style="background-color: #EAEAEA"
! scope="row" style="text-align:center" | 2004
|style="text-align:center;"|
| 9 || 13 || 9 || 4 || 151 || 84 || 235 || 48 || 41 || 0.7 || 0.3 || 11.6 || 6.5 || 18.1 || 3.7 || 3.2
|-
! scope="row" style="text-align:center" | 2005
|style="text-align:center;"|
| 9 || 24 || 13 || 7 || 254 || 178 || 432 || 95 || 83 || 0.5 || 0.3 || 10.6 || 7.4 || 18.0 || 4.0 || 3.5
|- style="background-color: #EAEAEA"
! scope="row" style="text-align:center" | 2006
|style="text-align:center;"|
| 9 || 15 || 7 || 2 || 134 || 119 || 253 || 48 || 40 || 0.5 || 0.1 || 8.9 || 7.9 || 16.9 || 3.2 || 2.7
|-
! scope="row" style="text-align:center" | 2007
|style="text-align:center;"|
| 9 || 23 || 11 || 10 || 201 || 246 || 447 || 85 || 84 || 0.5 || 0.4 || 8.7 || 10.7 || 19.4 || 3.7 || 3.7
|- style="background-color: #EAEAEA"
! scope="row" style="text-align:center" | 2008
|style="text-align:center;"|
| 9 || 21 || 8 || 7 || 196 || 232 || 428 || 95 || 112 || 0.4 || 0.3 || 9.3 || 11.0 || 20.4 || 4.5 || 5.3
|-
! scope="row" style="text-align:center" | 2009
|style="text-align:center;"|
| 9 || 18 || 2 || 2 || 195 || 212 || 407 || 88 || 55 || 0.1 || 0.1 || 10.8 || 11.8 || 22.6 || 4.9 || 3.1
|- style="background-color: #EAEAEA"
! scope="row" style="text-align:center" | 2010
|style="text-align:center;"|
| 9 || 23 || 7 || 1 || 257 || 301 || 558 || 87 || 140 || 0.3 || 0.0 || 11.2 || 13.1 || 24.3 || 3.8 || 6.1
|-
! scope="row" style="text-align:center" | 2011
|style="text-align:center;"|
| 9 || 24 || 5 || 12 || 319 || 258 || 577 || 62 || 186 || 0.2 || 0.5 || 13.3 || 10.8 || 24.0 || 2.6 || 7.8
|- style="background-color: #EAEAEA"
! scope="row" style="text-align:center" | 2012
|style="text-align:center;"|
| 9 || 19 || 2 || 5 || 257 || 213 || 470 || 59 || 128 || 0.1 || 0.3 || 13.5 || 11.2 || 24.7 || 3.1 || 6.7
|-
! scope="row" style="text-align:center" | 2013
|style="text-align:center;"|
| 9 || 20 || 10 || 12 || 234 || 202 || 436 || 50 || 153 || 0.5 || 0.6 || 11.7 || 10.1 || 21.8 || 2.5 || 7.7
|- style="background-color: #EAEAEA"
! scope="row" style="text-align:center" | 2014
|style="text-align:center;"|
| 9 || 23 || 0 || 4 || 312 || 176 || 488 || 113 || 89 || 0.0 || 0.2 || 13.6 || 7.6 || 21.2 || 4.9 || 3.9
|-
! scope="row" style="text-align:center" | 2015
|style="text-align:center;"|
| 9 || 17 || 1 || 7 || 185 || 163 || 348 || 80 || 71 || 0.1 || 0.4 || 10.9 || 9.6 || 20.5 || 4.7 || 4.2
|- style="background-color: #EAEAEA"
! scope="row" style="text-align:center" | 2016
|style="text-align:center;"|
| 47 || 20 || 2 || 3 || 268 || 238 || 506 || 129 || 86 || 0.1 || 0.2 || 13.4 || 11.9 || 25.3 || 6.5 || 4.3
|-
! scope="row" style="text-align:center" | 2017
|style="text-align:center;"|
| 47 || 20 || 0 || 0 || 209 || 196 || 405 || 115 || 74 || 0.0 || 0.0 || 10.5 || 9.8 || 20.3 || 5.8 || 3.7
|- class="sortbottom"
! colspan=3| Career
! 313
! 90
! 89
! 3438
! 3012
! 6450
! 1238
! 1446
! 0.3
! 0.3
! 11.0
! 9.6
! 20.6
! 4.0
! 4.6
|}

Personal life
In 2008, Kelly was an ambassador for an anti-alcohol-fuelled violence campaign run by the Geelong Advertiser titled "Just Think". In this role, Kelly appeared in advertising alongside fellow ambassadors, and Geelong teammates, Tom Harley and David Wojcinski.

Honours
AFL
 3× AFL Premiership: (2007, 2009, 2011)
 2× AFL Pre-Season Premiership: (2006, 2009)
 All-Australian team: 2011
 Jim Stynes Medal: 2011
 AFL Rising Star nominee: 2001

Geelong
 Geelong FC Best First Year Player Award: (2002)
 VFL Premiership Player: (2002)

TAC Cup
 TAC Cup Premiership: (2001)
 TAC Cup Team of the Year: (2001)

References

External links

 

Essendon Football Club players
Geelong Football Club players
Geelong Football Club Premiership players
1983 births
Living people
Australian rules footballers from Melbourne
Calder Cannons players
All-Australians (AFL)
Southern Districts Football Club players
Australia international rules football team players
Three-time VFL/AFL Premiership players